ISO 20700 Guidelines for management consultancy services is a standard developed for use as a guideline for people or organizations for the effective management of management consulting services. 

The standard was developed by ISO project committee ISO/PC 280. ISO 20700 was published for the first time in 2017. 

In 2018, CEN published EN ISO 20700:2018 and withdrew EN 16114 in 2019.

ISO 20700 correlates with EN 16114.

Main requirements of the standard 
The ISO 20700:2017 adopt the following structure:
 Purpose
 Normative references
 Terms and definitions
 Principles
 Contracting
 Execution
 Closure

See also 
 EN 16114
List of ISO standards
 International Organization for Standardization
ICMCI

References

External links 
  ISO 20700 — Guidelines for management consultancy services
 ISO PC 280 — ISO project committee ISO/PC 280, Management consultancy

20700
Management consulting